Oscar Badger may refer to:
 Oscar C. Badger II (1890–1958), United States Navy admiral and Medal of Honor recipient
 Oscar C. Badger (1823–1899), his grandfather, United States Navy officer